Moçambique Expresso, s.a.r.l. is an airline based in Beira, Mozambique. It operates domestic and regional scheduled and charter services. Its main base is Maputo International Airport.

History
The airline was established in September 1995 as Special Operations Department of LAM Mozambique Airlines. It started operations and became Moçambique Expresso in 1995 as an independent airline. It is wholly owned by LAM and has 50 employees (at March 2007).

Destinations

Moçambique Expresso operates within the route network of its parent LAM Mozambique Airlines.

Fleet

Current fleet
The Moçambique Expresso fleet consists of the following aircraft (as of February 2021):

Former fleet
The airline fleet previously included the following aircraft:

 2 British Aerospace Jetstream 41
 2 CASA C.212- Aviocar
 2 Embraer EMB 120RT Brasilia

References

External links

 Moçambique Expresso (Archive)

Airlines of Mozambique
Airlines established in 1995